ABCT may refer to:

 Anthony Bean Community Theater
 Armored brigade combat team, a formation of the U.S. Army
 Association for Behavioral and Cognitive Therapies
 Austrian Business Cycle Theory
 Airfields of Britain Conservation Trust